Apagomerina is a genus of longhorn beetles of the subfamily Lamiinae, containing the following species:

 Apagomerina apicalis Galileo & Martins, 2001
 Apagomerina azurescens (Bates, 1881)
 Apagomerina diadela Martins & Galileo, 1996
 Apagomerina erythronota (Lane, 1970)
 Apagomerina faceta Martins & Galileo, 2007
 Apagomerina flava Galileo & Martins, 1989
 Apagomerina gigas Martins & Galileo, 2007
 Apagomerina ignea Martins & Galileo, 1996
 Apagomerina jucunda Martins & Galileo, 1984
 Apagomerina lampyroides Martins & Galileo, 2007
 Apagomerina lepida Martins & Galileo, 1996
 Apagomerina odettae Martins & Galileo, 2007
 Apagomerina rubricollis Galileo & Martins, 1992
 Apagomerina subtilis Martins & Galileo, 1996
 Apagomerina unica Martins & Galileo, 1996
 Apagomerina utiariti Galileo & Martins, 1989

References

 
Hemilophini